Ekamra Walks is a weekly heritage walk for visitors to explore the heritage trails of Ekamra Kshetra or the temple city of Bhubaneswar. The walk is a non-profit initiative by the unified effort of Bhubaneswar Municipal Corporation, Bhubaneswar Development Authority, and Odisha Tourism, and curated by an agency called Detour Odisha. The guided walk-through in Old Town, Bhubaneswar starts every Sunday morning at 0630 AM from Mukteswar Temple and terminates in Ekamravan (the garden of medicinal plants).

Old Town Bhubaneswar, also known as Ekamra Kshetra is the center of Kalingan temple architecture. In 2014, Ekamra Kshetra earned a place in UNESCO’S tentative list of World Heritage sites. Ekamra Walks, hence borrows its name from “Ekamra Kshetra” and is a free guided tour for people interested in the history and culture of the land that once hosted more than 7000 temples.

Ekamra Walks values the experience of the Old Town area which includes the rustic lanes, temple kitchen, and Hindu rituals near Bindusagar lake. Along with a dash of facts, figures, and stories related to the ancient edifices and shrines, which are included in the trail, it also includes an Odissi recital by the students of renowned Odissi danseuse Ileana Citaristi at her dance academy, Art vision.

Route
The trail links eight major shrines, a vintage colonial guest house, the holy Bindusagar lake, a medicinal garden and Odissi performance for the participants. It covers a stretch of 2 kilometers inclusive of the untouched original Old town experience.

The heritage trail includes the following:
Mukteshwar Temple : A 10th-century edifice, an epitome of the religious confluence of three major religions – Jainism, Buddhism and Hinduism depicted through its architecture, dedicated to the Hindu Lord Shiva.
Parashurameswar Temple : Also dedicated to Shiva, this temple dates back to 7th century, one of the oldest surviving temples in the state, every stone carries a story of the Hindu mythology. 

Bindusagar Lake : The largest existing water tank in the Old town area, embanked by beautiful stone stairs, surrounded by temples. The tank also has a small temple in the center. 

Ananta Basudev Temple : This is the only temple dedicated to Lord Vishnu in the Old Town, which is predominated by temples dedicated to Lord Shiva. It was built by a princess, Chandrika Devi. The unique temple kitchen and food market within the temple premises called “Ananda Bazar” are a part of the Ekamrawalk experience.
Dharmashala : A vintage guesthouse built in the colonial style of architecture. This structure is more than a century year old and was originally built by a philanthropist Doodhwala to be used by pilgrims seeking salvation in Ekamra Kshetra. It is still used by pilgrims.

Lingaraj Temple : “Lingaraj” means the “King of all Linga”(linga being the phallic symbol emblematic of Lord Shiva). This temple is the tallest temple, the epitome of Kalingan architecture. It is assigned to a period from 1030 AD to 1065 AD. 
Chitrakarini Temple : A temple dedicated to the female force, Shakti. While temples dedicated to male gods have the suffix “eshwar” added to it, temples like Chitrakarini has a suffix “karini”, since it is a temple with a female deity. The main temple stands in the center surrounded by four smaller temples in the four corners of the temple premises.   
Sari Temple : The temple is similar to Ananta Basudev. Though the temple no longer has a residing deity, the architecture and antiquity attracts visitors.   
Baitala Temple : Deriving its name from the Odia word ‘Boitala’ meaning “boat”, this 8th century temple is dedicated to the female deity “Chamunda”, the aggressive form of the female force, Shakti. The curvilinear top of the temple looks akin to an upturned boat. The semi-cylindrical shape of its roof, a leading example of khakhara order of temple, bears an affinity to the Dravidian Gopurams of South Indian temples. Its gabbled towers with a row of shikaras reveals signs of southern intrusion. Once, it was the hotspot of Tantrik practices. 
Ekamravan: Created in the year 2009, the garden of medicinal plants lies on the west bank of Bindusagar tank. 
Odissi Dance : Odissi dance recital by the students of the renowned Odissi danseuse Ileana Citaristi in "Art Vision" Dance school

References 

Tourism in Odisha
Government schemes in Odisha